Wychwood, or Wychwood Forest, is an area in rural Oxfordshire, England.

Wychwood may also refer to:

 Wychwood, a 2017 novel by George Mann
 Wychwood Barns, a community centre and park in the Bracondale Hill area of Toronto
 Wychwood Brewery, Witney, Oxfordshire
 Wychwood Carhouse, informal name of the former St. Clair Carhouse, Toronto
 Wychwood Festival, an annual music festival held at Cheltenham racecourse in Gloucestershire, England
 Wychwood Park, a neighbourhood enclave and former gated community in Bracondale Hill, Toronto
 Wychwood School, an independent girls' school in Oxford, England
 Wychwood Way, a waymarked long-distance footpath in southern England

See also